Anephiasca is a genus of mites in the family Ascidae.

Species
 Anephiasca castrii Athias-Henriot, 1969

References

Ascidae